The James County Courthouse is a historic building located in Ooltewah, Tennessee. It was built in 1913 as the third courthouse of the now defunct James County. It continued to function in that capacity until 1919, when James County went bankrupt and was absorbed by Hamilton County. In 1976, the building was listed on the National Register of Historic Places.
The building was privately purchased in 2000 and is used as the Mountain Oaks Wedding Chapel.

Gallery

References

Buildings and structures in Hamilton County, Tennessee
County courthouses in Tennessee
1913 establishments in Tennessee
Courthouses on the National Register of Historic Places in Tennessee
Government buildings completed in 1913
Ooltewah, Tennessee
National Register of Historic Places in Hamilton County, Tennessee